Maksim Igorevich Ustinov (born 27 September 1987) is a Russian former professional football player.

Career
He played in the Moldovan National Division for FC Politehnica Chișinău in 2008.

In July 2019, Ustinov joined resurrected FC Kuban Krasnodar.

References

External links
 
 

1987 births
Living people
Russian footballers
Association football midfielders
FK Bokelj players
FC Tekstilshchik Ivanovo players
FC SKA Rostov-on-Don players
FC Kuban Krasnodar players
Moldovan Super Liga players
Russian expatriate footballers
Expatriate footballers in Montenegro
Expatriate footballers in Moldova